Selkirk (February 19, 1988 – January 3, 2013) was an American-bred Thoroughbred race horse and sire who raced mainly in Europe. Bred in Pennsylvania and owned by American philanthropist businessman George W. Strawbridge Jr., he was trained by Ian Balding. At the end of 1991, his third year, he had a record of 3-1-2 out of seven starts. In total, he had won six of his 15 starts. He retired from racing in 1993 and began his stud career at Kirsten Rausing's Lanwades stud farm in Newmarket, England, where he sired 92 stakes winners from 987 foals. He died on January 3, 2013, at the age of 25.

Background
Selkirk was a chestnut horse with a white blaze and long white socks on his hind legs, bred in Pennsylvania by his owner George Strawbridge. He was sired by Sharpen Up, a British racehorse who won the Middle Park Stakes in 1971 before becoming a successful breeding stallion. His other progeny included Pebbles, Kris and Diesis. Selkirk's dam, Annie Edge was a successful racemare for Strawbridge on both sides of the Atlantic, winning the Park Stakes in 1983, and the New York Stakes a year later. Strawbridge sent his colt to be raced in Europe and trained at Ian Balding's Kingsclere training facility near Watership Down, Hampshire, England.

Racing career

1990: two-year-old season
Selkirk never contested a maiden race, instead starting his career in a Listed stakes event. On September 14 Selkirk won his debut race in the Stardom Stakes at Goodwood by four lengths with a time of 1m 38.56s. He was immediately moved up to the highest level for the Group One Grand Critérium at Longchamp on October 6 in which finished fourth at around three lengths behind champion Hector Protector.

1991: three-year-old season
In the first half of the year, Selkirk had begun to experience pain and his racing began to falter. Veterinarian Simon Knapp discovered that the horse had an un-descended or trapped testicle. Surgery and subsequent recovery was required.

On September 6, Selkirk returned to racing. The Milcars Temple Fortune Stakes at Kempton Park was his first impressive win as he broke the course record by almost three seconds, winning by five lengths with a time of 1m 36.43s. Both owner and trainer took the win as a sign Selkirk was not only back in racing form, but also more improved. He was entered into the Queen Elizabeth II Stakes at Ascot on September 28 against the best milers of Europe, such as Kooyonga and Shadayid. Selkirk won that race by  lengths at a time of 1m 44.34s.

His previous victory allowed him to be highweighted at the 1991 English Free Handicap at 7 to  furlongs. He received his first honor in 1991 as Timeform named him Europe's Champion Miler. This honor followed him into his fourth year and 1992.

1992: four-year-old season
On his first appearance of the new season Selkirk won the Lockinge Stakes at Newbury on May 15 by  lengths over Lahib (1m 36.99s). Selkirk was set to become the first horse since Brigadier Gerard in 1972 to win consecutive runnings of the Queen Elizabeth II Stakes, but his regular jockey Ray Cochrane had been suspended. Former jockey John Reid and Selkirk finished third. His next -length finish came on October 15 at Newmarket in the seven-furlong Challenge Stakes with a time of 1m 22.27s over Thourios. Native-American Selkirk finished his racing career on October 31 at Gulfstream Park at the Breeders' Cup Mile. The tight turns and high humidity of the track proved difficult for Selkirk and he came in fifth across the wire, five lengths behind winner Lure.

Stud career
At the age of five, Selkirk retired to Kirsten Rausing's Lanwades Stud farm in Newmarket, England. The horse's stud fee in 1993 was USD$32,506 (£20,000). That price had doubled by 2005. Within 20 years, he had sired 92 stakes winners from 987 foals, 16 of which became Grade/Group 1 winners and two top line winners. His most successful offspring included Classic winners Wince and Kastoria as well as Nahrain, Cityscape, Sublimity and the Pretty Polly Stakes winner Thistle Bird.

Death
Selkirk died of old age on January 3, 2013. Of his death, Kirsten Rausing stated: "We will greatly miss him, but his memory will live on, not only here at the stud, but throughout the Thoroughbred industry in this country and abroad." Former trainer Ian Balding added: "He was a wonderful racehorse first and then went on to prove himself as a champion stallion ... He was just a lovely horse to have anything to do with. Most people used to say he wanted soft ground but he went on anything."

Career races

* Place finished, distance won/lost by.
** A course record at the time.

Pedigree

References

1988 racehorse births
2013 racehorse deaths
Racehorses bred in Pennsylvania
Racehorses trained in the United Kingdom
Thoroughbred family 15-a